Sigfús Sigurðsson (19 February 1922 – 21 August 1999) was an Icelandic athlete. He competed at the 1948 Olympics in the shot put and finished 12th with a throw of 13.66 m. Earlier that year he set his personal best at 14.78 m.

His grandson, also Sigfús Sigurðsson, won a silver medal in handball at the 2008 Olympics.

References

1922 births
1999 deaths
Icelandic male shot putters
Athletes (track and field) at the 1948 Summer Olympics
Olympic athletes of Iceland